Emiliano Zapata was a leading figure in the Mexican Revolution

Emiliano Zapata may also refer to:

 Emiliano Zapata (film), a 1970 film
 Emiliano Zapata Municipality (disambiguation), several municipalities in Mexico
 Emiliano Zapata, Hidalgo
 Emiliano Zapata, Jalisco
 Emiliano Zapata, Morelos
 Emiliano Zapata, Tabasco
 Emiliano Zapata, Veracruz
 Emiliano Elias Zapata (born 1986), Argentinian footballer